The International Center for Ethnobotanical Education, Research, and Service (ICEERS) is a non-profit organization (NPO), headquartered in Barcelona (Catalonia, Spain). ICEERS is dedicated to transforming society's relationship with psychoactive plants by engaging with some of the fundamental issues resulting from the globalization of ayahuasca, iboga, and other ethnobotanicals. Founded in 2009, ICEERS is registered as a non-profit organization, and has charitable status in the Netherlands and Spain, and through partner organizations in the US and UK. ICEERS also has consultative status with the United Nations’ ECOSOC.

Vision
ICEERS envisions a future where psychoactive plant practices are valued and integrated parts of society. Dedicated to turning challenges into opportunities, their vision is that of a future where society's relationship with these plants is transformed – where every individual and each community is granted the right to pursue healing and self-empowerment, where indigenous cultures are respected, and where bridges are built between traditional knowledge and science. ICEERS is dedicated to bridging the ethnobotanical knowledge of indigenous peoples with modern science and therapeutic practice, responding to the urgent need for efficient tools for personal and social development.

According to their website, the organization's mission includes:
 Conducting scientific research around the therapeutic use of psychoactive plants;
 Studying and promoting policies in the fields of psychedelic science and drug policy, based on scientific evidence and human rights;
 Developing the field of support and integration for people wishing to access treatment or experiences with plant teachers;
 Convening community events and gatherings with the aim of bridging knowledge; and
 Offering legal information and support to people experiencing legal challenges related to transport or use of ayahuasca or other psychoactive plants.

History 
The International Center for Ethnobotanical Education, Research & Service (ICEERS) was founded on May 20, 2009, by Benjamin De Loenen (director of the 2014 documentary Ibogaine-Rite of Passage) as a philanthropic, tax-exempt non-profit organization (charity) dedicated to the integration of ayahuasca, iboga and other traditional plants as therapeutic tools in modern society, and the preservation of indigenous cultures that have been using these plant species since antiquity.

According to its founder and executive director, Benjamin de Loenen, "Over time more people joined the team with scientific and drug policy reform backgrounds, and we started to broaden our scope and address the subject matter from these different angles. Right now, we do scientific research, we also try to make science understandable for policy makers and broader audiences. We educate through the website, offering harm reduction and risk reduction information, and we are involved in policy reform."

ICEERS has grown since 2009 from having a few volunteers and no budget at that time, to 14 staff in 2019. In 2010, ICEERS offered their first training to health departments about ibogaine, as well as organizing a conference about this subject at the Catalan Health Department in that same year. They have also engaged in relationship building and advocacy with decision-makers and international bodies at the United Nations. In 2010, in a letter responding to an ICEERS’ query, the International Narcotics Control Board (INCB) confirmed that "no plant or concoction containing DMT, including ayahuasca, is currently under international control."  Moreover, ICEERS has participated in the development of important guidelines for human rights and drug policy, led by the International Centre on Human Rights and Drug Policy, co-published by the WHO, UNDP and UNAIDS. They have also organized side-events at the Commission on Narcotic Drugs in Vienna for several years and have engaged several times at the UN Human Rights bodies in Geneva.

Between 2016 and 2019, the team supported more than 120 legal cases with plant medicine in 27 countries through their legal defense program, the Ayahuasca Defense Fund, creating positive legal precedents.

ICEERS has built a united, culturally diverse and international community through the World Ayahuasca Conference, held in Ibiza, Spain, in 2014, Rio Branco, Brazil, in 2016, and in Girona, Spain, in 2019. The 2019 edition was the largest ever ayahuasca event in history with 1400 participants from 35 countries.

ICEERS has also seeded community self-regulatory processes in different countries fostering collective responsibility, ethics, safety and efficient strategies towards regulation.

In Catalonia and Spain, ICEERS has played a leading role advancing an integral cannabis regulation and creating spaces for the voices of medical cannabis patients and medical doctors in the political debate.

Moreover, they have published dozens of scientific peer-reviewed papers, book chapters and other educational materials. ICEERS has organized events at the United Nations, EMCDDA, numerous government agencies, and has presented at conferences worldwide. In 2019, the Catalan Health Department commissioned ICEERS to write and publish a new informative guide on ayahuasca, which is a compilation of basic ethical and security standards for the use of ayahuasca in non-Amazonian contexts and deals with areas of legality and both individual and collective responsibility.

Through their support service they have helped hundreds of people who have faced challenging or adverse experiences after the use of psychoactive plants and are leaders in developing approaches to the integration of psychedelic experiences. Apart from that, they are committed to learning new ways of reciprocal alliance building with indigenous peoples, and gaining and sharing deeper understandings of the indigenous knowledge that surrounds these plants. They collaborate with the Union of Indigenous Yagé Doctors of the Colombian Amazon, an organization created in 1999 that includes five indigenous ethnicities from southwestern Colombia that works to preserve the Amazon rainforest and to revitalize and protect cultures and ancestral medicines.

Initiatives

Ayahuasca Defense Fund (ADF)
ICEERS has a decade of legal defense experience, which was formalized in 2016 with the launch of the Ayahuasca Defense Fund program. By September 2019, they had offered support in over 56 cases in 22 countries, several of which set positive legal precedents, and negative precedents were avoided in most other cases. From 2008 to 2017, the ADF noted a significant increase in the legal incidents across the globe. The ADF continues providing assistance around legal incidents, creating new supporting documents for legal teams, updating their online legal information, and developing new legal and human rights arguments based on previous casework.

Crisis Support
This service provides integration psychotherapy sessions for people in challenging situations after experiencing non-ordinary states of consciousness. ICEERS' support program has helped people worldwide to integrate challenging or adverse experiences since 2013. This donation-based offering was a pioneer in offering integration services and has provided a unique perspective into why and how these situations occur. Over time, they have analyzed and consolidated these key learnings in order to develop training programs and an integration manual for practitioners and integration specialists.

CANNABMED
ICEERS is a generally trusted reference point for information on science and socio-political transformation. They have organized three CANNABMED conferences in 2016, 2018 and 2020. Through this process, they successfully supported cannabis patients to self-organize (they now have their own patient's organization, the Patients Union for Cannabis Regulation) and also bringing medical professionals together so that they can work together collectively.

CANNABMED has promoted the creation of a patient association and a clinical society of professionals interested in the therapeutic potential of cannabis. Hundreds of people with health problems have found a benchmark from CANNABMED and have organized to fight for their rights.

CANNABMED events have provided a framework for civil society, health professionals and politicians to meet, discuss, and build relationships. Since the first event, ICEERS has led several community development processes that resulted in the creation of two new actors in the cannabis regulation scene. First, a patient's union, and in 2019, a health professional NGO that is now operating autonomously (the Endocannabinology Clinical Society). The first CANNABMED Congress was held at the Autonomous University of Barcelona (UAB), the second one at the College of Physicians of Barcelona, and the third at the College of Pharmacists of Barcelona.

ICEERS has authored and collaborated in several publications about the topic of the Cannabis Social Clubs in Spain.

PsychēPlants
In 2017, ICEERS received an EU Commission grant for a project called PsychēPlants, through which they developed a series of reports about psychoactive plants, fungi and animal secretions as well as a risk-reduction website to share this important information. This funding also resourced their support service for 18 months and funded a 4-hour course for the EMCDDA (European Monitoring Centre for Drugs and Drug Addiction), as well as an online course for health professionals.

World Ayahuasca Conference
The first World Ayahuasca Conference was held in 2014 in Ibiza, Spain, and the second in 2016 in Rio Branco, capital of Acre, in Brazil. The third edition took place in Girona, Spain, from May 31 to June 2, 2019.

According to their website, the World Ayahuasca Conference is "much more than a conference. It is an instrument for social change – an opportunity to create alignment within the community so that we can co-create a positive future for these plant practices. It’s an opportunity to cross-pollinate between different social movements, seeding new collaborations. And, importantly, it’s an opportunity to shine a light on the intrinsic connection between the globalization of ayahuasca and the on-going resistance being waged by indigenous peoples against the destruction of sacred land – the Amazon rainforest – so essential for ecological balance."

Iboga/ine Community Engagement Initiative
Practices with iboga and ibogaine are expanding. The cultural, social, and political contexts surrounding the human relationship to this plant and its alkaloids, are complex and ICEERS has sought to bring careful consideration to the impacts of their globalization. The Iboga/ine Community Engagement Initiative sought to engage with the global community to crowdsource opinions and ideas about what an ideal future looks like for iboga and ibogaine in global society – from African and international stakeholders.

Biocultural conservation, regeneration and alliance building
ICEERS has been working to develop strategies to leverage more interest and capacity for efforts to conserve and regenerate the plants and indigenous knowledge systems of the Amazon, Gabon and beyond. This work is enabled through collaborations with Dr Bronner’s, RiverStyx Foundation, and the Union of Indigenous Yagé Doctors of the Colombian Amazon.

Research
ICEERS builds bridges between traditional knowledge and science to address some of society's most challenging health conditions and to build a more connected society. ICEERS conducts scientific studies on the potential benefits of psychoactive plants, principally cannabis, ayahuasca, and ibogaine, public health, and the role of traditional medicine practices in Global Mental Health. In order to embrace the complex systems in which these ethnobotanicals are embedded, the research team has carried out several studies from a multidisciplinary approach, effectively combining different disciplines ranging from the biomedical research in lab settings to ethnographic explorations.

ICEERS, in collaboration with other institutions, published the Ayahuasca Technical Report, as well as the most complete study about neuropsychiatric long-term effects of ayahuasca, the first study showing brain changes in long-term ayahuasca ceremony participants, studies about ayahuasca therapeutical potential, theoretical reflections regarding therapeutic potential of ethnobotanicals, and research in cannabis therapeutic potential for chronic diseases, among others. ICEERS collaborates closely with the group of the Department of Neuroscience and Behavior, Ribeirão Preto Medical School, University of São Paulo, with the Medical Anthropology Research Center (MARC) at the Rovira i Virgili University, Tarragona, and with the Autonomous University of Madrid. ICEERS is initiating the first-ever clinical trials with ibogaine for opioid dependence in collaboration with the Hospital Sant Joan de Reus.

References 

Cannabis law reform organizations
Drug control law
Drug culture
Drug policy
Drug policy organizations
Entheogens
Iboga
International medical and health organizations
International charities
Lysergic acid diethylamide
Medicinal use of cannabis organizations
Mental health
Organizations established in 2009
Political controversies
Psilocybin
Psychedelic drug research
Public health organizations